The Sultan Qaboos Prize for Environmental Preservation is a biennial award sponsored by the United Nations Educational, Scientific and Cultural Organization (UNESCO) and the Sultan Qaboos Bin Said of Oman "to afford recognition to outstanding contributions by individuals, groups of individuals, institutes or organizations in the management or preservation of the environment, consistent with the policies, aims and objectives of UNESCO, and in relation to the Organization's programmes in this field."

The award consists of a diploma and a grant of USD $70,000.00, which is financed by the interest on a USD $250,000.00 donation by Sultan Qaboos Bin Said.

Laureates
Source: UNESCO
 1991: Instituto de Ecología, A.C..
 1993: Jan Jenik.
 1995: Lake Malawi National Park.
 1997: Department of Environmental Sciences, Alexandria University and Forest Department.
 1999: Charles Darwin Foundation
 2001: Chad Association of Volunteers for the Protection of the Environment.
 2003: Center for Ecology and Peter Johan Schei.
 2005: Great Barrier Reef Marine Park Authority and Ernesto Enkerlin.
 2007: Institute of Biodiversity Conservation and Julius Oszlányi.
 2009: Autonomous Authority for National Parks (OAPN).
 2011: Institute for Forest Research of Nigeria
 2013: State Forests National Forest Holding of Poland and South Africa’s Endangered Wildlife Trust
 2015: Fabio A. Kalesnik, Horacio Sirolli and Luciano Iribarren of the Wetlands Ecology Research Group of the University of Buenos Aires, Argentina
 2017: The National Parks Board of Singapore
 2019: Ashoka Trust for Research in Ecology and the Environment (ATREE) India

See also

 List of environmental awards

External links
UNESCO: Sultan Qaboos Prize for Environmental Preservation

References

UNESCO awards
Awards established in 1991
Environmental awards
1991 establishments in Oman
Omani awards